Yingjiang may refer to:

Yingjiang District, a district of Anqing, Anhui, Sichuan
Yingjiang County, a county in Dehong Dai and Jingpo Autonomous Prefecture, Yunnan, China